Henry Brazeale Walthall (March 16, 1878 – June 17, 1936) was an American stage and film actor. He appeared as the Little Colonel in D. W. Griffith's The Birth of a Nation (1915).

Early life
Henry B. Walthall was born March 16, 1878 on a cotton plantation owned by his father in Shelby County, Alabama. His father had been a captain in the Confederate States Army.

In 1898, during the Spanish–American War, he enlisted in the First Alabama Regiment. He contracted malaria while in camp in Jacksonville, Florida, and the war ended before he had recovered. He served 11 months, and when his regiment was discharged he returned home. Then, with $100, he left for New York to make his career on the stage. He played small parts with the Murray Hill Theater stock company. Later he became affiliated with the American Theater stock company and soon afterward joined the Providence, Rhode Island, stock company.

Career

In New York in 1901, Walthall won a role in Under Southern Skies by Charlotte Blair Parker. He performed in the play for three years, in New York and on tour. With the company of Henry Miller he gained recognition on Broadway in plays, including Pippa Passes, The Only Way and William Vaughn Moody's The Great Divide (1906–08). His fellow cast member James Kirkwood introduced Walthall to D. W. Griffith, and at the conclusion of that engagement, Walthall joined the Biograph Company.

His career in films began in 1909 at Biograph Studios in New York with a leading role in the film A Convict's Sacrifice. This film also featured James Kirkwood, and was directed by D.W. Griffith, a director that played a huge part in Walthall's rise to stardom. As the industry grew in size and popularity, Griffith emerged as a director, and Walthall found himself a mainstay of the Griffith company, frequently working with Griffith regulars such as Owen Moore, Lionel Barrymore, Harry Carey, Lillian and Dorothy Gish, Blanche Sweet, Mae Marsh, Bobby Harron and Jack and Mary Pickford. He followed Griffith's departure from New York's Biograph to California's Reliance-Majestic Studios in 1913. After a few months with Reliance, he joined Pathé for a short period.

He decided to go into the producing business and formed The Union Feature Film Company, the first to be devoted entirely to full-length films. The venture was not successful, however, and he again became associated with Griffith's company.
 
Given the relatively short length of films in the early years, Walthall frequently found himself cast in dozens of films each year. He gained national attention in 1915 for his role as Colonel Ben Cameron in Griffith's highly influential and controversial epic The Birth of a Nation. Walthall's portrayal of a Confederate veteran rounding up the Ku Klux Klan won him large-scale fame, and Walthall emerged as a leading actor in the years leading up to the 1920s, parting ways with Griffith.

Walthall continued working in films through the 1920s, appearing in The Plastic Age with Gilbert Roland and Clara Bow. He portrayed Roger Chillingworth in Victor Sjöström's 1926 adaptation of The Scarlet Letter with Lillian Gish.

Walthall continued his career into the 1930s. After his performance in director John Ford's 1934 film Judge Priest starring Will Rogers he enjoyed a golden period of his career. He portrayed Dr. Manette in A Tale of Two Cities (1935), starring Ronald Colman. In 1936, he appeared as Marcel in The Devil-Doll and as Captain Buchanan in the American Civil War drama Hearts in Bondage. He was gravely ill during his final film China Clipper.

Frank Capra wanted Walthall to portray the High Lama in his 1937 film Lost Horizon. "Frail and failing, he died before we could test him," Capra wrote.

Walthall has a star on the Hollywood Walk of Fame located at 6201 Hollywood Boulevard.

Personal life
Lillian Gish described Walthall as "a slight man, about five feet six, fine-boned, with the face of a poet and a dreamer." She recalled his patience while Griffith grappled with technical problems filming the epilogue of Home, Sweet Home (1914), a scene in which Gish, as an angel, lifts Walthall's character out of hell. "There was a long discussion while Walthall and I, encased in leather harness, hung on the guide wires. Wally, a true southern gentleman, didn't raise his voice, didn't complain; he simply fainted and hung there limply."

Walthall was married twice. His marriage to actress Isabel Fenton (1904–1918) ended in divorce. His second marriage to Irish actress Mary Charleson lasted from 1918 until his death in 1936.

Exhausted from months of uninterrupted film work, Walthall collapsed on the Warner Bros. set after completing his scenes in the film China Clipper, in which he portrayed an airplane inventor. He entered the Pasteur Sanitarium at Monrovia, California, and died of an intestinal illness three weeks later on June 17, 1936.

Filmography

References

External links

Tribute Site
portrait of Henry B. Walthall (moviecard)
Literature on Henry B. Walthall
Henry B Walthall Find a grave

1878 births
1936 deaths
People from Shelby County, Alabama
American male film actors
American male silent film actors
Male actors from Alabama
Burials at Hollywood Forever Cemetery
Vaudeville performers
20th-century American male actors